The FIBA Oceania Championship for Men 1997 was the qualifying tournament of FIBA Oceania for the 1998 FIBA World Championship. The tournament was held in Wellington and Palmerston North.  won the tournament to qualify for the World Championship.

Teams that did not enter

Venues

Results

Championship

Final standings

Australia qualified for the 1998 FIBA World Championship.

References
FIBA Archive

FIBA Oceania Championship
Championship
1997 in New Zealand basketball
1997 in Australian basketball
International basketball competitions hosted by New Zealand
Australia men's national basketball team games
New Zealand men's national basketball team games